Pondus is a Norwegian comic strip and magazine.

Pondus may also refer to:

 The Pondus Penguin, a character in the Danish children's book, Pondus the Penguin, written and illustrated by Ivar Myrhøj in 1966
 Pondus, brand name of the drug Nandrolone propionate
Neo-Pondus, brand name of the drug Androisoxazole

See also
pH (pondus hydrogenii)